Edward Sayers may refer to:

Edward Sayers (RAF airman) (1897–1918), English World War I flying ace
Edward Sayers (parasitologist) (1902–1985), New Zealand doctor
Edward Sayers (politician) (1818–1909), New South Wales politician
Eddie Sayers (born 1941), Northern Irish loyalist